Kemper (also Palmer's Prairie) is an unincorporated community in Jersey County, Illinois, United States. It is located on Illinois Route 267, northwest of Medora and south of Rockbridge.

References

Unincorporated communities in Illinois
Unincorporated communities in Jersey County, Illinois